Matkalla Porkkalaan is a Finnish play. It was written about Ivan Belov and the events before his death in 1944 in the Lauttasaari and was performed in 2006.

Finnish plays
2006 plays
Plays based on real people